Faculty of Medicine of Pavel Jozef Šafárik University is an educational and scientific institutions offering tertiary education in doctoral studies and public health programmes. Faculty of Medicine is the oldest institution of Pavol Jozef Šafárik University and was founded in 1948, 11 years before establishment of University.

Study programmes 
Faculty of Medicine provides doctoral studies in the study programmes of General medicine and Dental Medicine, as well as undergraduate and graduate studies in the study programs of nursing, physiotherapy and public health and doctoral studies. There were more than 500 students enrolled in both Slovak and English languages in academic year 2014/2015.

History 
The Faculty of Medicine at Pavol Jozef Šafárik University in Košice is an institution with over 65-year long history. Faculty was founded in September 1948 and nowadays has over 12 thousand of graduates. Since 1992, Faculty has been offering medical studies in the English language to international students. Number of international students grows rapidly, there were 899 international students in 2015.

Organisational structure 
Faculty runs under ECTS (European Credit Transfer and Accumulation System) grading scheme and is involved in international cooperation with other educational institutions worldwide.

The Faculty of Medicine in Košice consists of 60 units – institutes, departments, scientific research and experimental workplaces, and special-purpose facilities. Faculty is located in close proximity to the L. Pasteur University Hospital, where students take the bulk of their practical training. Its teaching base represents a total of 11 medical institutions that allow students a direct contact with patients and employment of modern treatment methods. Faculty of Medicine in Kosice has been rewarded as the second best medical faculty in Slovakia.

International cooperation 
Faculty of Medicine in Košice is involved in international cooperation with other educational institutions within programme Erasmus+. Cooperation faculties are from all over the Europe. Faculty is also taking part in various international conferences, such as International Student Medical Congress Košice 2015, which attended more than 150 medical students.

References

Medical schools in Slovakia
Educational institutions established in 1948
Education in Slovakia
Universities in Slovakia
1948 establishments in Czechoslovakia